The 18th Filmfare Awards South Ceremony honoring the winners of the best of South Indian cinema in 1970 was an event held in Shanmukhananda Hall Bombay on 18 April 1971 along with Hindi Awards.

The president of this year's function was the Governor of Maharashtra Ali Yavar Jung. The chief guest of the evening was Vietnamese film star Kieu Chinh.

Jury

Awards

Awards presentation

 B. R. Panthulu (Best Film Kannada) Received Award from Rekha
 M. O. Joseph (Best Film Malayalam) Received Award from Biswajit
 T. G. Krishnamurthy (Best Film Telugu) Received Award from Nimmi
 Director K. Balaji (Best Film Tamil) Received Award from Joysree Roy

References

 Filmfare Magazine April 9, 1971.

General

External links
 
 

Filmfare Awards South